Lubbock (On Everything) is a 1979 double album by Texas singer, songwriter and piano player Terry Allen, released on Fate Records. It was reissued on compact disc in 1995 by Sugar Hill Records. and reissued again on CD and LP in October 2016 by Paradise of Bachelors. The 2016 LP reissue comes with a high quality 28 page LP booklet.

It was recorded in 1978 at Caldwell Studios in Lubbock, Texas, and was engineered and mastered by Don Caldwell and Lloyd Maines, who also played pedal steel and other instruments on the record. "Amarillo Highway" was later covered by Robert Earl Keen, and "Truckload Of Art" by Cracker. Little Feat released a version of "New Delhi Freight Train" on their 1977 album, Time Loves a Hero – two years before Terry Allen recorded it for the Lubbock (On Everything) album.

Track listing 
All songs written by Terry Allen

 "Amarillo Highway (for Dave Hickey)"
 "Highplains Jamboree"
 "The Great Joe Bob (A Regional Tragedy)"
 "The Wolfman Of Del Rio"
 "Lubbock Woman"
 "The Girl Who Danced Oklahoma"
 "Truckload Of Art"
 "The Collector (and the Art Mob)"
 "Oui (a French Song)"
 "Rendevouz USA"
 "Cocktails for Three"
 "The Beautiful Waitress"	
 "High Horse Momma"
 "Blue Asian Reds (for Roadrunner)"
 "New Delhi Freight Train"
 "FFA"
 "Flatland Farmer"
 "My Amigo"
 "The Pink And Black Song"
 "The Thirty Years Waltz (for Jo Harvey)"
 "I Just Left Myself"

Personnel
Terry Allen - piano, vocals
Lloyd Maines - pedal steel, guitars, dobro, mandolin, banjo, bell tree, harmony vocals
Kenny Maines - bass, harmony vocals
Curtis McBride - drums
Allan Shinn - percussion, marimba, jawbone, skin castanets
Richard Bowden - fiddle
Ponty Bone - accordion
Don Caldwell - saxophone, string arrangements
Joe Ely - harmonica
Luis Martinez - jazz guitar (on "Cocktails for Three")
Jesse Taylor - "flatland guitar" (on "Flatland Farmer")
Tommie Anderson - trumpet
Mark Anthony - trombone
Russ Standefer - tuba
Ruth Ann Truncale - violin
Susan Allen - violin
Karen Blalack - cello
Leslie Blackburn - viola
Monterey High School Marching Band - school song
Sylvester "band-aid" Rice, Gwen Hewitt, Suzanne Paulk, Jo Harvey Allen - harmony vocals
Freddy Pride, Mike Austin, Vincent Thomas, Jimmy Sampson - "whooooit" harmony

References

1979 albums
Terry Allen (artist) albums
Sugar Hill Records albums